Harry Chamberlain (born 16 November 1995) is a New Zealand cricketer. He made his List A debut for Canterbury on 25 January 2017 in the 2016–17 Ford Trophy. He made his first-class debut on 27 March 2021, for Canterbury in the 2020–21 Plunket Shield season.

See also
 List of Canterbury representative cricketers

References

External links
 

1995 births
Living people
New Zealand cricketers
Canterbury cricketers
Cricketers from Christchurch